Mario Sánchez (13 April 1934 – September 2017) was a Mexican sports shooter. He competed at the 1972 Summer Olympics and the 1984 Summer Olympics.

References

1934 births
2017 deaths
Mexican male sport shooters
Olympic shooters of Mexico
Shooters at the 1972 Summer Olympics
Shooters at the 1984 Summer Olympics
Place of birth missing
20th-century Mexican people